Ulsan O clan was one of the Korean clans. Their Bon-gwan was in Ulsan. According to the research in 1985, the number of Ulsan O clan was 2696. As a result,  served as a munha sirang pyeongjangsa and began Ulsan O clan. Then,  was appointed as Prince of Hakseong because he defeated Wokou.

See also 
 Korean clan names of foreign origin

References

External links 
 

 
Korean clan names of Chinese origin